Genesee Wesleyan Seminary and Genesee College Hall are two historic buildings located on the campus of Elim Bible Institute at Lima in Livingston County, New York. The Genesee Wesleyan Seminary building was constructed in 1842 and now serves as the college Administration Building.  It is a -story neoclassical–style brick structure. It features a 2-story verandah composed of two tiers of sturdy columns. The Genesee College Hall was completed in 1851 and is a complete neoclassical temple form.  It measures two and a half stories high and five bays wide, with an Ionic hexastyle portico extending the length of the south facade.

It was listed on the National Register of Historic Places in 1976.

References

External links
Elim Bible Institute

Properties of religious function on the National Register of Historic Places in New York (state)
Religious buildings and structures completed in 1842
Buildings and structures in Livingston County, New York
School buildings completed in 1853
National Register of Historic Places in Livingston County, New York